Milan Popović may refer to:
 Milan N. Popović (1924–2012), Serbian psychiatrist-psychoanalyst
 Milan Popović (born 1955), a.k.a. Daniel (Montenegrin singer)
 Milan Popovic (songwriter), Serbian journalist and songwriter
 Milan Popović (handballer) (born 1990), Montenegrin handball player
 Milan B. Popović (born 1976), Serbian poet and journalist